The 2020 Women's European Volleyball League was originally to be held as the 12th edition of the annual Women's European Volleyball League, which features women's national volleyball teams from 18 European countries. The tournament was cancelled due to the COVID-19 pandemic by the CEV Board of Administration decision taken on 23 April 2020.

The tournament has two divisions: the Golden League, featuring twelve teams, and the Silver League, featuring six teams.

Pools composition
Teams were seeded following the Serpentine system according to their European Ranking for national teams as of September 2019. Rankings are shown in brackets.

Golden league

Silver league

Pool standing procedure
 Total number of victories (matches won, matches lost)
 In the event of a tie, the following first tiebreaker will apply: The teams will be ranked by the most point gained per match as follows:
Match won 3–0 or 3–1: 3 points for the winner, 0 points for the loser
Match won 3–2: 2 points for the winner, 1 point for the loser
Match forfeited: 3 points for the winner, 0 points (0–25, 0–25, 0–25) for the loser
 If teams are still tied after examining the number of victories and points gained, then the FIVB will examine the results in order to break the tie in the following order:
Set quotient: if two or more teams are tied on the number of points gained, they will be ranked by the quotient resulting from the division of the number of all set won by the number of all sets lost.
Points quotient: if the tie persists based on the set quotient, the teams will be ranked by the quotient resulting from the division of all points scored by the total of points lost during all sets.
If the tie persists based on the point quotient, the tie will be broken based on the team that won the match of the Round Robin Phase between the tied teams. When the tie in point quotient is between three or more teams, these teams ranked taking into consideration only the matches involving the teams in question.

Golden league
All times are local.

Pool A

 

|}

|}

Pool B 

 

|}

|}

Pool C

 

|}

|}

Silver league
All times are local.

Pool A

 

|}

|}

Pool B

 

|}

|}

Final round
All times are Central European Summer Time (UTC+02:00).

Golden league

Semifinals

|}

3rd place match

|}

Final

|}

Silver league

Final

|}

Leg 1

|}

Leg 2

|}

See also
2021 Men's European Volleyball League

References

Europe
European Volleyball League
European Volleyball League, 2020 Women's